Mary Ellen Humphreys (née Rahilly) (28 April 1871 – 2 December 1939) was an Irish revolutionary, Cumann na mBan leader and Dublin city councillor active in the period from 1916 to 1923.  Born in Ballylongford, Co. Kerry to Richard Rahilly and Ellen Mangan, she was a sister of the 1916 leader The O'Rahilly and the republican activist Anno O'Rahilly.  She married Dr. David Humphreys of Limerick Workhouse in 1895.  Her father-in-law was the Co. Limerick Poor Law Guardian, James Humphrys.  Her son Dick Humphreys joined the Irish Volunteers and was active in Easter week. Her daughter Sheila Humphreys became a Cumann na mBan leader and republican activist.

Following the death of Nell Humphrey's brother The O'Rahilly in combat she was arrested and detained in the aftermath of the Easter rising. She joined the Ranelagh Branch of Cummann na mBan in 1919 and was elected as a republican member of Pembroke Urban District Council in 1920. During the Civil war she was detained for the period November 1922 to July 1923.

Shortly before her death in 1939 she commissioned a Harry Clarke stained glass window in Mountjoy Prison where she had previously been detained.  The window remains in place in the prison chapel.

References

1871 births
1939 deaths
People of the Easter Rising
People from County Kerry
Sinn Féin politicians
Cumann na mBan members